Charles A. Chase Jr. Memorial Field , is located in Dover-Foxcroft, Maine, United States.

Facilities and Aircraft
Charles A. Chase Jr. Memorial Field is situated one mile southwest of the central business district, and contains one runway.

For the 12-month period ending August 10, 2008, the airport had 696 aircraft operations, an average of 58 per month: 86% local general aviation, and 14% transient general aviation. At that time there were five aircraft based at this airport: 80% single-engine and 20% ultralight.

References

Dover-Foxcroft, Maine
Airports in Piscataquis County, Maine